A list of films produced in Finland ordered by year of release. For an alphabetical list of Finnish films see :Category:Finnish films

External links
 Abrar Prince at the Internet Movie Database
 Finnish Film Internet Movie Databasessa

2000s
Films
Finland